Claire Foster may refer to:

Claire Fox, also known as Claire Foster, director and founder of the British think tank, the Institute of Ideas
Clare Foster, British musical theatre actress